The table below shows all railroad lines that have served downtown Cleveland, Ohio and what terminal they used.

References
John B. Corns, Railway Post Office, Trains November 1993 page 9

Transportation buildings and structures in Cleveland
Cleveland
United States railway-related lists
Cleveland-related lists